Heining-lès-Bouzonville (literally Heining near Bouzonville) is a commune in the Moselle department in Grand Est in north-eastern France.  It is just 500m from the border with Germany.

It takes its name from the Abbey of Bouzonville. It was variously in the ownership of the Abbey at Bouzonville and the Abbey of St Maximin in Trier.

From 1815 it was a border town. In the 1930s, the border between France and the Saarland was closed; the French government funded a new church for Heining, the church of Sainte-Jeanne d'Arc de Leiding.

See also
 Communes of the Moselle department

References

External links
 

Heininglesbouzonville